Edward Wright may refer to:

Edward Wright (mathematician) (1561–1615), English mathematician and cartographer
Edward Wright (principal) (c.1605-1683) Principal of Glasgow University
Edward Wright (artist) (1912–1988), painter, typographer and graphic designer
Edward Wright (Medal of Honor) (1829–1901), American Civil War sailor and Medal of Honor recipient
Edward L. Wright (born 1947), American astrophysicist and cosmologist
Edward Fortescue Wright (1858–1904), English cricketer
Edward George Wright (1831–1902), New Zealand engineer and politician
Edward Percival Wright (1834–1910), Irish ophthalmic surgeon, botanist and zoologist
Ed Wright (composer) (born 1980), English composer
E. M. Wright (1906–2005), English mathematician
Ed Wright (baseball) (1919–1995), Major League Baseball pitcher
Gordon Wright (footballer) (Edward Gordon Dundas Wright, 1884–1947), English footballer
Bearcat Wright (Edward Wright, 1932–1982), African-American professional wrestler 
Edward Wright (Lancashire cricketer), cricket player in the 1840s
Edward Wright (cricketer, born 1945), former English cricketer
Edward Wright (cricketer, born 1874) (1874–1947), English cricketer 
Edward Wright (sailor) (born 1977), British sailor
Edward Richard Wright (1813–1859), English comedian and actor
Edward W. Wright (1817–1866), American pastor
Edward Herbert Wright (1863–1930), American politician and political activist
 Dr Edward Wright, early settler in Adelaide, who arrived on the Cygnet in the 1836 First Fleet of South Australia

See also
Ed Wright (disambiguation)
Edgar Wright (born 1974), British director, screenwriter, producer, and actor